László Marton (5 November 1925 – 5 October 2008) was a Munkácsy  and Kossuth Prize-winning Hungarian sculptor from Budapest, Hungary. The original  statuette of the Little Princess Statue sitting on the railings of the Danube promenade in Budapest, Hungary was created by him.

References

External links 

1925 births
2008 deaths
Hungarian sculptors
Artists of Merit of the Hungarian People's Republic
People from Tapolca